Complete Auto Transit, Inc. v. Brady, 430 U.S. 274 (1977), is a United States Supreme Court case regarding the Commerce Clause and sales tax.

Background 
Complete Auto was a Michigan-based auto transporter involved in moving General Motors vehicles from the railhead at Jackson, Mississippi to dealerships in Mississippi. The vehicles were assembled outside Mississippi.

The Mississippi State Tax Commission levied a tax upon Complete Auto "for the privilege of engaging or continuing in business or doing business" in the state of Mississippi. The Court refers to the tax as a "sales tax"; however, it was a "transaction privilege" or gross receipts tax based on Complete Auto's gross receipts.

Complete Auto paid the taxes of $122,160.59 under protest, and then undertook a refund action in the Chancery Court of the First Judicial District of Hinds County. Complete Auto claimed that its transportation was but one part of an interstate movement, and that the taxes assessed and paid were unconstitutional as applied to operations in interstate commerce. The Chancery Court, in an unreported opinion, sustained the assessments.

Complete Auto appealed to the Mississippi Supreme Court. The Court unanimously affirmed and concluded:

It will be noted that Taxpayer has a large operation in this State. It is dependent upon the State for police protection and other State services the same as other citizens. It should pay its fair share of taxes so long, but only so long, as the tax does not discriminate against interstate commerce, and there is no danger of interstate commerce being smothered by cumulative taxes of several states. There is no possibility of any other state duplicating the tax involved in this case.

Arguments 
Complete Auto argued against the constitutionality of tax, stating that they were part of an interstate operation, involved in transporting vehicles from the factories in Michigan to the dealers in Mississippi. According to Complete Auto, taxation on interstate operations not only discourages interstate commerce but also is a violation of the Commerce Clause.

Ruling 
The Supreme Court ruled in favor of Mississippi. The ruling established a four-prong test for constitutionality of a tax under the Commerce Clause:

Substantial nexus - connection between a state and a potential taxpayer clear enough to impose a tax.
Nondiscrimination - interstate and intrastate taxes should not favor one over the other.
Fair apportionment - taxation of only the apportionment of activity that transpires within the taxing jurisdiction.
Fair relationship to services provided by the state - company enjoys services such as police protection while in a state.

Even though Complete Auto asserted that it was a part of an interstate operation, the Court agreed with Mississippi that while operating within the state, it was afforded services, such as police protection, provided for by taxation.

Subsequent developments 
The test enunciated in Complete Auto Transit received significant interpretation in Commonwealth Edison Co. v. Montana, 453 U.S. 609 (1981).

References

External links
 

United States Constitution Article One case law
United States Supreme Court cases
United States Supreme Court decisions that overrule a prior Supreme Court decision
United States Supreme Court cases of the Burger Court
United States Dormant Commerce Clause case law
United States taxation and revenue case law
1977 in United States case law